This is a list of the main career statistics of professional tennis player David Ferrer.

Performance timelines

Singles

Doubles

Significant finals

Grand Slam finals

Singles: 1 (1 runner-up)

Year-end championship finals

Singles: 1 (1 runner-up)

Olympics finals

Men's Doubles: 1 Bronze Medal match (0–1)

Masters 1000 finals

Singles: 7 (1 title, 6 runners-up)

ATP career finals

Singles: 52 (27 titles, 25 runner-ups)

Doubles: 3 (2 titles, 1 runner-up)

Team competition: 4 (3 titles, 1 runner-up)

Record against other players

Ferrer's record against those who have been ranked in the top 2, with active players in boldface

* Statistics include Davis Cup matches.

Record against top 20 players
Ferrer's match record against players who were ranked world No. 20 or higher at the time is as follows, with those who have been No. 1 in boldface: 

 Nicolás Almagro 15–1
 Fernando Verdasco 14–7
 Fabio Fognini 11–0
 Philipp Kohlschreiber 11–3
 Feliciano López 11–8
 Richard Gasquet 10–3
 Alexandr Dolgopolov 10–4
 Andreas Seppi 9–1
 David Nalbandian 9–5
 Gilles Simon 8–2
 Tommy Robredo 8–2
 Radek Štěpánek 8–3
 Tomáš Berdych 8–8
 Juan Carlos Ferrero 7–2
 John Isner 7–2
 Jürgen Melzer 7–2
 Andy Roddick 7–4
 Stanislas Wawrinka 7–7
 Ivan Ljubičić 6–1
 Janko Tipsarević 6–1
 Albert Ramos Viñolas 6–2
 Juan Martín del Potro 6–7
 Andy Murray 6–14
 Rafael Nadal 6–26
 Grigor Dimitrov 5–1
 Marcel Granollers 5–1
 Florian Mayer 5–3
 Dominik Hrbaty 5–3
 Igor Andreev 5–4
 Juan Mónaco 5–4
 Fernando González 5–5
 Novak Djokovic 5–16
 Pablo Cuevas  4–0
 Tommy Haas 4–0
 Milos Raonic 4–0
 Ernests Gulbis 4–0
 Ivo Karlović 4–1
 Viktor Troicki 4–1
 Marcos Baghdatis 4–2
 Marin Čilić 4–2
 Bernard Tomic 4–2
 Mardy Fish 4–4
 Mikhail Youzhny 4–5
 Kei Nishikori 4–10
 Robin Söderling 4–10
 Roberto Bautista Agut 3–1
 Lleyton Hewitt 3–1
 Jo-Wilfried Tsonga 3–1
 Jonas Björkman 3–1
 Sébastien Grosjean 3–1
 Benoit Paire 3–1
 Sam Querrey 3–1
 Agustin Calleri 3–2
 Kevin Anderson 3–3
 Gaël Monfils 3–3
 Gastón Gaudio 3–4
 José Acasuso 3–5
 Alexander Zverev 3–5
 Albert Costa 2–0
 David Goffin 2–0
 Jerzy Janowicz 2–0
 Vincent Spadea 2–0
 Mariano Puerta 2–0
 Mario Ančić 2–1
 Thomas Johansson 2–1
 Nicolas Kiefer 2–1
 Jarkko Nieminen 2–1
 Fabrice Santoro 2–1
 Albert Portas 2–1
 Nicolas Massu 2–1
 Nicolas Lapentti 2–1
 Jack Sock 2–2
 Juan Ignacio Chela 2–2
 Jiří Novák 2–2
 Pablo Carreño Busta 2–2
 Kyle Edmund 2–2
 Xavier Malisse 2–3
 Nikolay Davydenko 2–4
 Robby Ginepri 2–4
 Carlos Moyá 2–6
 Andre Agassi 1–0
 Nikoloz Basilashvili 1–0
 Guillermo Cañas 1–0
 Hyeon Chung 1–0
 Karol Kucera 1–0
 Arnaud Clément 1–1
 Gustavo Kuerten 1–1
 Nick Kyrgios 1–1
 Max Mirnyi 1–1
 Marat Safin 1–1
 Dominic Thiem 1–1
 Andrea Gaudenzi 1–1
 Paradorn Srichaphan 1–1
 James Blake 1–2
 Lucas Pouille 1–2
 Guillermo Coria 1–4
 Tim Henman 0–1
 Todd Martin 0–1
 Jan Michael Gambill 0–1
 Wayne Ferreira 0–1
 Stefan Koubek 0–1
 Casper Ruud 0–1
 Sjeng Schalken 0–1
 Diego Schwartzman 0–2
 Karen Khachanov 0–2
 Felix Mantilla 0–2
 Paul-Henri Mathieu 0–2
 Rainer Schuettler 0–2
 Dmitry Tursunov 0–2
 Àlex Corretja 0–3
 Roger Federer 0–17

Top 10 wins
He has a 54–123 (.305) record against players who were, at the time the match was played, ranked in the top 10.

ATP Tour career earnings

Notes

References

External links 
 
 
 

Ferrer, David